Jim Reed (1845-1874) was a member of the Quantrill's Raiders during the American Civil War, along with the James brothers (Jesse and Frank James) and the Youngers (Jim, John, Bob and Cole). He was killed by a law officer in Paris, Texas in 1874.

Belle Starr fought with his brother John Allison Bud when she met her sweetheart Jim Reed when his family moved to Texas. They met after a bank robbery in Missouri in 1866. They got married on 1 November 1866 in Collin County, Texas. Then they ran away to Missouri and she became his common-law wife. They had a child in 1868 they named Rosie Lee but the couple broke up when Reed met another woman named Rosa McCommas.

Jim Reed appears in the videogame Call of Juarez: Gunslinger (2013), where he is revenged by Silas Greaves.

References

1845 births
1874 deaths
James–Younger Gang
Deaths by firearm in Texas
People shot dead by law enforcement officers in the United States